Darius Strole (born 20 May 1974) is a Lithuanian former professional racing cyclist.

Major results
1997
 1st  National Road Race Championships
1998
 1st Antwerpse Havenpijl
 3rd National Road Race Championships
2000
 2nd National Time Trial Championships
2003
 2nd Antwerpse Havenpijl
2004
 1st  Overall Tour de Liège
 1st Grand Prix Etienne De Wilde

References

1974 births
Living people
Lithuanian male cyclists